Hierodoris bilineata is a species of moth in the family Oecophoridae. It is endemic to New Zealand. This species is classified as "At Risk, Naturally Uncommon" by the Department of Conservation. It is possible that this species gives birth to live young rather than lay eggs as is the norm.

Taxonomy
This species was first described by John  Salmon in 1948 using specimens obtained from flowering kanuka trees on Great Island, Three Kings Islands by E. G. Turbot and named Heliostibes bilineata. In 1988 John S. Dugdale assigned the species to the genus Hierodoris. The holotype specimen is held at the Auckland War Memorial Museum.

Description
Salmon describes the species as follows:

H. bilineata can be distinguished from other species in its genus as it has unmarked and unmodified antennae, a non-metallic appearance to its thorax and it is smaller in size than other species of similar appearance.

Distribution
This species is endemic to New Zealand. It is likely that H. bilineata is found only at the Three Kings Islands. Along with its type locality of Great Island, it has also been collected from South West Island.

Biology and behaviour 
Little is known of the biology of this species. It has been hypothesised, as a result of the discovery of a larva in the oviduct of a female moth during dissection, that this species gives birth to live young rather than laying eggs. The adults of this species are on the wing in April and May.

Host species and habitat 
The host species for the larvae of this moth is currently unknown however it appears that this species is associated with Kunzea ericoides.

Conservation Status 
This species has been classified as having the "At Risk, Naturally Uncommon" conservation status under the New Zealand Threat Classification System.

References

Moths described in 1948
Moths of New Zealand
Xyloryctinae
Endemic fauna of New Zealand
Endangered biota of New Zealand
Three Kings Islands
Endemic moths of New Zealand